Łęki may refer to:

Łęki, Brzesko County in Lesser Poland Voivodeship (south Poland)
Łęki, Myślenice County in Lesser Poland Voivodeship (south Poland)
Łęki, Łódź Voivodeship (central Poland)
Łęki, Nowy Sącz County in Lesser Poland Voivodeship (south Poland)
Łęki, Oświęcim County in Lesser Poland Voivodeship (south Poland)
Łęki, Ciechanów County in Masovian Voivodeship (east-central Poland)
Łęki, Siedlce County in Masovian Voivodeship (east-central Poland)

See also
 Leki (disambiguation)